The official discography of My Chemical Romance, an American rock band, consists of four studio albums, two live albums, three compilation albums, six extended plays, 26 singles, four video albums, 18 music videos, and 13 original appearances on other albums.

Shortly after forming, the band signed to Eyeball Records and released its first album, I Brought You My Bullets, You Brought Me Your Love, in 2002, which has since sold over 285,000 copies. The band signed with Reprise Records the next year and released its major label debut, Three Cheers for Sweet Revenge, in 2004. The album was a commercial success and sold over 3 million copies due in part to the high airplay and sales of the singles "I'm Not Okay (I Promise)" and "Helena". The band released The Black Parade, its third studio album, in 2006, which sold over 4 million copies and features the successful singles "Welcome to the Black Parade", "Famous Last Words", and "Teenagers". The band's fourth studio album, Danger Days: The True Lives of the Fabulous Killjoys, was released in 2010 and featured the successful single "Sing".

Albums

Studio albums

Live albums

Compilation albums

EPs

Singles

Other certified songs

Videography

Video albums

Music videos

Other original album appearances

See also
 List of songs recorded by My Chemical Romance
 Gerard Way discography

Notes

References

External links
 
 [ My Chemical Romance artist profile] at AllMusic
 My Chemical Romance discography at Discogs

Discographies of American artists
Discography
Post-hardcore group discographies
Pop punk group discographies